"Gimme Dat Ding" is a 1970 popular UK song, of the novelty type, sung by "one-hit wonder" The Pipkins, and written and composed by Albert Hammond and Mike Hazlewood. Released as a single, it is the title selection of an album which The Pipkins recorded and released on the EMI Columbia Records label. It also appeared on a compilation album of the same name, which The Pipkins shared with another up-and-coming UK group, The Sweet. It has also been included on many other compilation albums. "Gimme Dat Ding" was arranged by Big Jim Sullivan.

Chart history
The song peaked at number 6 on the UK Chart in March/April 1970. It reached number 7 in Canada, number 9 on the US Hot 100 and number 20 in US Easy Listening. It did best in New Zealand, where it reached number 1.

Weekly charts

Year-end charts

Song profile
"Gimme Dat Ding" is a call-and-response duet between a deep, gravelly voice, that of Tony Burrows, and a high tenor, that of Roger Greenaway. The voices are said to represent a piano and a metronome.

When Hammond and Hazlewood wrote and composed "Gimme Dat Ding," it was one selection from their musical sequence "Oliver in the Overworld," which formed part of the British children's show Little Big Time, hosted by Freddie and the Dreamers; this narrated a surreal story of a little boy seeking the parts to mend his grandfather clock. The lyrics relate to this story, the song being sung by a metronome who has been expelled by the Clockwork King. The "ding" has been stolen from the metronome by the "Undercog". The original version, as performed by Freddie Garrity, was released on the album Oliver in the Overworld in 1970.

Cover versions
Frankie Davidson released a cover version in Australia in 1970, reaching 21 on the local charts. A Czech version "Gimi Det Ding" was also released in 1970 as a vinyl single with alternate Czech lyrics (a silence-loving man complaining about his noisy female neighbour singing). The Norwegian vocal group Bjelleklang covered the song on their album YppeRu’ dOnK in 1994. The song was called Gummihatt (Swing) which is Rubberhat (Swing) in English.

In the UK, interest in the song resurfaced in the 1990s when the Maynards confectionery company used it in a popular television commercial for their Just Fruits fruit pastille and fruit gum range between 1992 and 1994; the song began reappearing on radio playlists during that era. In 1997, Dairylea also used the song in two advertisements in the UK.

An instrumental version arranged by Ronnie Aldrich was frequently used as background music during comedy sketches in The Benny Hill Show.

References

1970 songs
1970 debut singles
The Pipkins songs
Songs written by Albert Hammond
Songs written by Mike Hazlewood
Novelty songs
EMI Records singles
Tony Burrows songs
Number-one singles in New Zealand
Music hall songs